"Honey, I'm Home" is a song co-written and recorded by Canadian country music artist Shania Twain. It was released in August 1998 as the sixth single from her album Come On Over, and the fifth to country radio. The song was written by Twain and her then-husband Robert John "Mutt" Lange who produced the track. The song was originally released in the summer of 1998 following the mass success of "You're Still the One". The song went on to become Twain's seventh and to date, final number one single on the Billboard Country singles chart. "Honey, I'm Home" was included in both her Come on Over Tour and Up! Tour, as well as her Miami, Dallas and Chicago video specials. No commercial single was made available for this release.

Music video
The music video for "Honey, I'm Home" was taken from Twain's Louisville, Kentucky concert on July 8, 1998, it was released on August 19, 1998 on CMT. The video was directed by Larry Jordan. This was the first of three live videos taken from Come on Over. Unlike the other two, "Come on Over" and "Rock This Country!", "Honey, I'm Home" documents the entire show, while the other two are just of the performance of the respective song. Two versions of the video were made, one dubbing the 'Original Album Version' audio over the live footage, and the other dubbing the 'International Single Mix' over the live soundtrack. The 'Original Album Version' is available on Twain's compilations Come On Over: Video Collection (1999) and The Platinum Collection (2001), while the 'International Mix' can be seen on YouTube.

Chart performance 
Twain's label, Mercury, did not release a commercial single for "Honey, I'm Home," and as such it was ineligible to chart on the Billboard Hot 100. "Honey, I'm Home" debuted on the Billboard Hot Country Singles & Tracks chart the week of August 8, 1998 at number 70. The single spent 26 weeks on the chart and climbed to a peak position of number one on October 31, 1998, where it remained for one week. The single became Twain's seventh and to-date last number one at country radio. It also became her ninth top ten (fifth consecutive), and her 11th top 20 single on the country charts. "Honey, I'm Home" also topped the Hot Country Recurrents chart for one week.

Official versions
Original Album Version (3:39)
International Version (3:33)
Live from Dallas (Live/Direct TV Mix) (3:46)
Live from Still the One: Live from Vegas (3:42)

Covers and parodies
Country music parodist Cledus T. Judd parodied the song as "Shania, I'm Broke" on his 1999 album Juddmental.

Charts

Weekly charts

Year-end charts

Certifications

References

1998 singles
Shania Twain songs
Songs written by Robert John "Mutt" Lange
Song recordings produced by Robert John "Mutt" Lange
RPM Country Tracks number-one singles of the year
Songs written by Shania Twain
Mercury Records singles
Mercury Nashville singles
1997 songs